Francis Richard (born 1948) is a French orientalist. He is known for his research on Persian manuscripts in the Oriental collection of the Bibliothèque Nationale de France.
He is a winner of Farabi International Award.

References

1948 births
Living people
French orientalists
Farabi International Award recipients
French Iranologists